Charles Surasky is an expert numismatist with a special interest in postal notes. His work includes:
 Identifying the Postal Notes of 1883 to 1894, First Edition, 1985
 The Binion Collection: Silver Dollars from the Hoard of Ted Binion
 regular contributions to the American Numismatic's Association's "Money Talks"
 regular contributions to Numismatist
 and creation of numismatic related crossword puzzles.

References

American numismatists
Living people
Year of birth missing (living people)